Louis Hayes Petit (9 November 1774 – 13 November 1849) was an English barrister and politician.

Life

He was a younger son of the physician John Lewis Petit, who died in 1780, and was educated at Newcombe's School. Prepared for university by Samuel Parlby, he entered Queens' College, Cambridge, graduating B.A. in 1796, M.A, in 1799. He was called to the bar at Lincoln's Inn in 1801, and practised as a barrister to 1821.

He support parliamentary reform, and was returned again in 1831. He did not stand the 1832 election for the reformed parliament, having lost Elizabeth Lawrence's support.

Petit became a fellow of the Society of Antiquaries of London, in 1803, and of the Royal Society in 1807. He was a fellow also of the Linnaean Society, Geological Society and Royal Astronomical Society. His heir was John Louis Petit.

He died on the 13th November 1849 and is buried on the western side of Highgate Cemetery.

Notes

1774 births
1849 deaths
Burials at Highgate Cemetery
English barristers
UK MPs 1826–1830
UK MPs 1830–1831
UK MPs 1831–1832
Fellows of the Royal Society
Fellows of the Society of Antiquaries of London
Fellows of the Linnean Society of London
Fellows of the Geological Society of London
Fellows of the Royal Astronomical Society
Members of the Parliament of the United Kingdom for English constituencies
People educated at Newcome's School
Alumni of Queens' College, Cambridge
Members of Lincoln's Inn